The 1982–83 All-Ireland Senior Club Hurling Championship was the 13th staging of the All-Ireland Senior Club Hurling Championship, an inter-county knockout competition for Ireland's top championship clubs representing each county.  The championship was won by Loughgiel Shamrocks of Antrim, who beat St. Rynagh's of Offaly by 2–12 to 1–12 after a replay in the final. This marked the first occasion in which an Ulster side won an All-Ireland hurling title at senior grade. To date, no Ulster team has managed to add to this achievement.

Results

Connacht Senior Club Hurling Championship

First round

Second round

Semi-final

Final

Leinster Senior Club Hurling Championship

Preliminary round

First round

Quarter-finals

Semi-finals

Final

Munster Senior Club Hurling Championship

Quarter-finals

Semi-finals

Final

Ulster Senior Club Hurling Championship

Semi-finals

Final

All-Ireland Senior Club Hurling Championship

Quarter-finals

Semi-finals

Finals

Statistics

Top Scorers

Top scorers overall

Miscellaneous

 Following St. Rynagh's' defeat of Kiltormer in the All-Ireland semi-final, it was revealed that a St. Rynagh's player, Declan Fogarty, remained on the field for seven minutes after being sent off. The match was then awarded to Kiltormer, however, St. Rynagh's countered that Kiltormer had fielded an unregistered player. Kiltormer subsequently withdrew their complaint.

References

1982 in hurling
1983 in hurling
All-Ireland Senior Club Hurling Championship